Manizha Dalerovna Sangin (née Khamrayeva; ; ; born 8 July 1991), known professionally as simply Manizha, is a Russian-Tajik singer and songwriter, as well as a Goodwill Ambassador for the United Nations High Commissioner for Refugees. Beginning her career in 2003 as a child singer, Manizha went on to perform with the music groups Ru.Kola, Assai, and Krip De Shin, before later pursuing a solo career. She represented Russia in the Eurovision Song Contest 2021 with the song "Russian Woman".

Early life and education
Manizha was born on 8 July 1991 in Dushanbe to parents Najiba Usmanova, a psychologist and clothing designer, and a father who worked as a doctor. Her parents are divorced, and her father did not want Manizha to begin a singing career due to believing it was not a suitable career choice for a Muslim woman. Her great-grandmother was one of the first women in Tajikistan to remove her veil and begin a career of her own; in response to this, she had her children removed from her care, although she later was able to return to them and begin working outside of the home. Manizha changed her surname from Khamrayeva to Sangin in order to honor her grandmother, who was one of the first people who encouraged her to pursue music.

In 1994, Manizha and her family fled Tajikistan due to the Tajikistani Civil War, subsequently settling in Moscow. After arriving in Moscow, Manizha began studying at a music school, where she studied piano. She afterward left the school to begin training with private vocal coaches. Manizha studied psychology at the Russian State University for the Humanities.

Career

2003–2015: Early career
Manizha began her career in 2003, performing as a child singer. She took part in a number of children's singing competitions, winning the Grand Prix of the Rainbow Stars competition in Jūrmala, becoming a laureate of the Ray of Hope festival organized by Mir, and becoming a laureate of the Kaunas Talent competition in Kaunas. She recorded a number of songs in both Russian and Tajik, before joining the music project Ru.Kola in 2007. That year, she became a finalist at the Five Stars music competition in Sochi.

Manizha later left the Ru.Kola project, and joined the Russian group Assai in 2011. She later left Assai to join Krip De Shin soon after, which was formed along with other former members of Assai. With Krip De Shin, she recorded an extended play and performed at various music festivals throughout Russia. Due to creative differences between herself and the band, she later opted to leave the group. After leaving the group, Manizha moved to London, and later began studying gospel music in both London and New York City.

2016–2020: Independent breakthrough
In 2016, Manizha returned to her music career, with the release of several independently released singles. The singles were followed by the release of her debut studio album, Manuscript, which was independently released in February 2017. Following the release of Manuscript, Manizha began working on her second studio album, ЯIAM, which was released in March 2018. Describing the album, Manizha stated that it was based around the "architecture of the personality" of a person. Her debut solo extended play Womanizha was released in April 2019.

2021–present: Eurovision Song Contest
In March 2021, it was confirmed that 
Manizha would be taking part in the Russian national final for the Eurovision Song Contest 2021 with the song "Russian Woman". At the final, held in Moscow on 8 March 2021, Manizha was declared the winner after receiving 39.7% of the public vote. She represented Russia in the Eurovision Song Contest 2021, held in Rotterdam, where she placed ninth out of 26 countries, receiving 204 points.

After Russia invaded Ukraine on 24 February 2022, Manizha stated her opposition to the invasion, referring to the Ukrainian backgrounds of her (future) husband and daughter-in-law. She released the single "Soldier" on 13 March in response to the invasion.

As a consequence of the invasion, Russia was excluded from the Eurovision Song Contest 2022, and was banned from entering future contests. Due to this, Manizha remains the last Russian representative at the contest. (Not counting Tatyana Mezhentseva in the Junior contest)

Social positions

In 2017, Manizha began posting unedited photos of herself with the hashtag #TheTraumaOfBeauty and captions discussing her struggles with her body image. At her concert on the roof of the Château de Fantomas in Moscow, Manizha took off her stage makeup and invited the public to join this manifesto. She distributed wet wipes to those who wanted to.

Manizha supports various charitable foundations: she performed at the charity festival "Anton is here near" 2017, organised by the foundation helping autistic children; at the closing of the IX World Children's Games of the winners of 2018, organized by the "Give Life" Foundation helping children with cancer; took part in the "Star of Kindness" charity event in support of the "Children butterflies" and others.

In February 2019, Manizha launched a social campaign against domestic violence. As part of this project, she released a free mobile application called Silsila (in Persian - "thread") to help victims of domestic violence. The app allows users to quickly call for help in an emergency using the panic button and offers a list of the nearest crisis centers and shelters in which to hide. Not all the centers that the team listed had been tested, only some of them can be contacted regardless of gender, nationality and documents. In support of the campaign, together with the director Lado Quatania ("HypeProduction"), a video was released for the song "Mama" (Russian and English versions). The video raises the problem of domestic violence against women and adolescents, as well as the problems of transformation from a child to an adult. The video provides statistics on the scale of the problem of violence in Russia. Manizha's team collects their own statistics. The project was created without the support of the state, third-party companies or funds. Manizha's mother sold her apartment to help pay for the app.

Manizha also actively supports the LGBT community. In 2019, she starred in a video for the Russian online queer magazine "Otkritiye" ("Open") during Pride Month.   After that, as the singer admits, about 10 thousand people unsubscribed from her Instagram. In 2020, she sang her version of Cher's song "Believe" during the Otkritiye's Digital Pride. In the autumn of the same year, she performed at the Queerfest in St. Petersburg.

In October 2020, the United Nations High Commissioner for Refugees (UNHCR) announced Manizha as a Goodwill Ambassador for UNHCR.

On 9 December 2021, Manizha visited Almaty, Kazakhstan in honor of the 16 Days of Activism Against Gender-Based Violence campaign.

On 24 February 2022, Manizha stated her opposition to the 2022 Russian invasion of Ukraine via an Instagram post, referring to her husband and sister-in-law's Ukrainian background. Her opposition to the war led to her facing a campaign to have her blacklisted, leading to several promoters cancelling her performances after government supporters began posting personal information of concert organizers.

Awards and nominations
{| class="wikitable sortable plainrowheaders" 
|-
! scope="col" | Award
! scope="col" | Year
! scope="col" | Nominee(s)
! scope="col" | Category
! scope="col" | Result
! scope="col" class="unsortable"| 
|-
!scope="row" rowspan=2|Berlin Music Video Awards
| 2019
| "Мама"
| rowspan=2|Best Concept
| 
| 
|-
| 2020
| "Недославянка"
| 
|

Discography

Studio albums

Extended plays

Singles

References

External links

1991 births
21st-century Russian women singers
21st-century Russian singers
21st-century Tajikistani women singers
Eurovision Song Contest entrants of 2021
Eurovision Song Contest entrants for Russia
Living people
Naturalised citizens of Russia
Musicians from Moscow
People from Dushanbe
Russian feminists
Russian people of Tajikistani descent
Russian pop singers
Russian State University for the Humanities alumni
Tajik-language singers
Tajikistani emigrants to Russia
Russian women's rights activists
Russian LGBT rights activists
Russian human rights activists
Women human rights activists
Women civil rights activists
Russian activists against the 2022 Russian invasion of Ukraine